Valer Dorneanu (born 21 November 1944) is a Romanian politician and jurist. A prominent member of the Social Democratic Party (PSD), Dorneanu was the president of the Chamber of Deputies (the lower house of the Romanian Parliament) between December 2000 and November 2004. He spent four additional years in the Chamber, departing at the 2008 election. From 18 Octobre 2010 to 28 Mars 2013, he was adjoint to the Romanian Ombudsman office, in the military, juridical, police, and penitentiary areas. From 3 July 2012 to 23 January 2013, he functioned interimistically as the Ombudsman (Avocatului Poporului). Since 2013 he is a judge in Romania's Constitutional Court, for a mandate of 9 years, and the president of this institution since 2016.

Biography
In 1967, Dorneanu graduated from the Faculty of Law at the University of Bucharest. He has since become a Professor in the Faculty of Political Science at the University of Bucharest. From 1967 to 1974 he was a prosecutor at the courts of Sector 5 and Sector 6 in Bucharest. During the Communist era, he was one of the ideologues of former President and dictator Nicolae Ceaușescu.

In 2002, Dorneanu was awarded the Order of the Star of Romania, Knight rank.

References

1944 births
Living people
Members of the Chamber of Deputies (Romania)
Presidents of the Chamber of Deputies (Romania)
Social Democratic Party (Romania) politicians
Ombudspersons in Romania
20th-century Romanian lawyers
University of Bucharest alumni
Academic staff of the University of Bucharest
Knights of the Order of the Star of Romania
21st-century Romanian judges